Klaas George de Vries (born 28 April 1943) is a retired Dutch politician of the Labour Party (PvdA) and jurist.

De Vries attended a Gymnasium in Heerlen from June 1955 until July 1961 and applied at the Hamline University in Saint Paul, Minnesota in July 1961 majoring in Public Administration and obtaining a Bachelor of Public Administration degree in August 1962 before transferring to the Utrecht University in September 1962 majoring in Law and obtaining a Bachelor of Laws degree in June 1964 and graduating with a Master of Laws degree in July 1968. De Vries worked as a civil servant for the department for Administrative Affairs of the Ministry of Justice from August 1968 until April 1971 and as a researcher at the Erasmus University Rotterdam from April 1971 until May 1973. De Vries served on the Municipal Council of Delft from March 1970 until April 1974.

De Vries became a Member of the House of Representatives after Bram Stemerdink was appointed as State Secretary for Defence in the Cabinet Den Uyl after the election of 1972, taking office on taking office on 28 May 1973 serving as a frontbencher and spokesperson for Defence and chairing the parliamentary inquiry commission on construction grants. In August 1988 De Vries was nominated as Executive-Director of the Association of Municipalities, he resigned as a Member of the House of Representatives the same day he was installed as Executive-Director on 1 September 1988. In December 1995 De Vries was nominated as Chairman of the Social and Economic Council, he resigned as Executive-Director the same day he was installed as Chairman, taking office on 1 January 1996. After the election of 1998 De Vries was appointed as Minister of Social Affairs and Employment in the Cabinet Kok II, taking office on 3 August 1998. De Vries served as acting Minister of Agriculture, Nature and Fisheries from 7 June 1999 until 9 June 1999 following the resignation of Haijo Apotheker. De Vries was appointed as Minister of the Interior and Kingdom Relations following the resignation of Bram Peper, taking office on 24 March 2000. After the election of 2002 De Vries returned as a Member of the House of Representatives, taking office on 23 May 2002. The Cabinet Kok II was replaced by the Cabinet Balkenende I following the cabinet formation of 2002 on 22 July 2002 serving as a frontbencher and spokesperson for Integration. After the Leader of the Labour Party and Parliamentary leader of the Labour Party in the House of Representatives Ad Melkert announced that he was stepping down as Leader and Parliamentary leader in the House of Representatives following the defeat in the election, De Vries announced his candidacy to succeed him. De Vries lost the leadership election to former State Secretary for Finance Wouter Bos on 12 November 2002. In July 2006 De Vries announced that he wouldn't stand for the election of 2006 and continued to serve until the end of the parliamentary term on 30 November 2006.

De Vries remained in active in national politics, he was elected as a Member of the Senate after the Senate election of 2007, taking office on 12 June 2007 serving as a frontbencher and spokesperson for Foreign Affairs and chairing several parliamentary committees. De Vries also became active in the public sector and occupied numerous seats as a nonprofit director on several boards of directors and supervisory boards (Humanist Association, Parliamentary Documentation Center, Transnational Institute, International Fellowship of Reconciliation, Atlantic Association, Institute for Multiparty Democracy, ProDemos and the International Institute of Social History) and served on several state commissions and councils on behalf of the government (Council for Public Administration, Cadastre Agency, Advisory Council for Spatial Planning and Public Pension Funds APB) and as an advocate, lobbyist and activist for the Anti-war movement, Humanitarianism and Democracy. De Vries also worked as a sport administrator for the Olympic Committee*Dutch Sports Federation (NOC*NSF) and also served as a distinguished professor of Governmental Studies, Public administration and Political history at the Radboud University Nijmegen from 1 June 2009 until 10 October 2012. In November 2014 De Vries announced his retirement from national politics and that he wouldn't stand for the Senate election of 2015 and continued to serve until the end of the parliamentary term on 9 June 2015.

De Vries is known for his abilities as a debater and manager.

Decorations

References

External links

Official
  Prof.Mr. K.G. (Klaas) de Vries Parlement & Politiek
  Prof.Mr. K.G. de Vries (PvdA) Eerste Kamer der Staten-Generaal

 

 

Chairmen of the Social and Economic Council
Dutch crime fiction writers
Dutch democracy activists
Dutch nonprofit directors
Dutch nonprofit executives
Dutch expatriates in the United States
Dutch humanists
Dutch humanitarians
Dutch lobbyists
Dutch male novelists
Dutch mystery writers
Dutch public administration scholars
Dutch sports executives and administrators
Academic staff of Erasmus University Rotterdam
Governmental studies academics
Grand Officers of the Order of Leopold II
Grand Officers of the Order of Orange-Nassau
Hamline University alumni
Knights Commander of the Order of Merit of the Federal Republic of Germany
Knights of the Order of the Netherlands Lion
Labour Party (Netherlands) politicians
Members of the Social and Economic Council
Members of the House of Representatives (Netherlands)
Members of the Senate (Netherlands)
Ministers of Agriculture of the Netherlands
Ministers of Kingdom Relations of the Netherlands
Ministers of the Interior of the Netherlands
Ministers of Social Affairs of the Netherlands
Municipal councillors of Delft
People from Delft
People from Heerlen
People from Pijnacker-Nootdorp
Academic staff of Radboud University Nijmegen
Utrecht University alumni
20th-century Dutch civil servants
20th-century Dutch educators
20th-century Dutch jurists
20th-century Dutch politicians
21st-century Dutch civil servants
21st-century Dutch educators
21st-century Dutch historians
21st-century Dutch jurists
21st-century Dutch male writers
21st-century Dutch novelists
21st-century Dutch politicians
1943 births
Living people